Natra is an international company and one of the leading European producers and distributors of chocolate products and cocoa ingredients, focusing on private label with the leading retail and Co-manufacturing for the global brands.

Natra’s Consumer product division is responsible for the manufacturing of chocolate tablets, pralines, spreads and chocolate bars that are sold in more than 90 countries over the five continents.
Natra is also the main cocoa bean processor in Spain, responsible for 40% of cocoa grinding. Through its Ingredients division, the company provides cocoa derivatives (mainly cocoa butter, cocoa powder and chocolate coatings) for the international food industry.

Around 75% of the company’s turnover is generated outside Spain.

The company has six production plants (two in Spain, two in Belgium, one in France and one in Canada) and permanent commercial presence in Europe, America and Asia.

Origin and development
In 1943, three young chemists from Valencia (Arturo Benlloch, Juan Ferrándiz and Álvaro Faubel) invented a process for extracting theobromine, an alkaloid very similar to caffeine that is only found in cocoa. This gave rise to the creation of Natra.
In 1951 the business was expanded to include the production and sale of cocoa products. The company’s first factory was set up in Mislata (Valencia) with a loan from Banco Industrial.
In 2004 Natra took over Zahor (Spain) and embarked on a process of vertical integration, up to the end product for consumers. Zahor had a strong customer base and a significant turnover in Europe and it had just bought a plant in France specialising in chocolate tablets.
A year later, Chocolaterie Jacali (Belgium) was acquired and Natra extended its product range to include Belgian chocolates and specialties.
In 2007 Natra bought All Crump (Belgium) and set up a new business unit to produce spreads.
As from 2012 Natra stepped up the growth of its consumer division outside Europe, especially in America and Asia.
In 2017-2018 Natra started to implement a new customer-centric Transformation Plan to boost sustainable growth of the company. The Plan brought in a new organisational model and renovation of the management team.
2019 was a turning point for Natra as World Confectionery Group S.à.r.l. launched a takeover bid to control 100% of the capital. Under the new ownership, Natra went private and entered a new era, with continuity in operations and strategy, but increased focus on growth, driven by the boon of a new, stable, long-term investor.

Present and future
The company, which celebrated its 78th anniversary in 2021, is constantly adapting its business to the changing market and consumer trends and boosting its sustainable growth.
Natra is a member of the Rainforest Alliance to boost the sustainable production of cocoa. It also belongs to the global network of the UN Global Compact to promote and implement the Sustainable Development Goals (SDG). Natra is certified under the ISO 20400 standard, which guarantees the sustainable procurement of raw materials.
The company also has the key certifications for traceability and food safety to guarantee the quality and suitability of its products for its customers and consumers. Natra’s food safety management systems are certified under prestigious international standards such as the BRC (British Retail Consortium), IFS (International Food Standard) and FSSC 22000.
Natra also has specific certifications for certain products aimed at specific markets or segments of society, for example Kosher and Halal, as well as fair trade, ecological products and sustainable origin seals and certificates.

References

External links
 
 

Spanish chocolate companies
Companies listed on the Madrid Stock Exchange
Manufacturing companies based in Madrid